Verano azul is a Spanish television drama series directed by Antonio Mercero. It was first broadcast on La Primera Cadena of Televisión Española from October 11, 1981 to February 14, 1982.

The series tells the adventures of a group of youngsters between ages 9 and 17, while on summer vacation in a small coastal town on the Spanish Mediterranean Costa del Sol.

With 19 episodes it drew up to 20 million viewers in Spain (Televisión Española was the only television network available in Spain until 1983) and has been re-run several times since then. It was also broadcast in Latin America, Portugal, France, Yugoslavia, Bulgaria, Poland and Czechoslovakia.

Characters
Chanquete (Antonio Ferrandis), a sailor who lives in La Dorada 1ª, a fishing boat set up as a house on land near a cliff. He was born in 1924.
Julia (María Garralón) is a lonely painter on vacation in the town. In the chapter "The Rainbow Smile" the reason for her loneliness is revealed. She was born in 1948.
Pancho García (José Luis Fernández) is from the town and works as a delivery man for a grocery store run by his uncles, with whom he lives. He is the character with the most personality in the gang, that is because his parents passed away. He was born in 1965.
Javi (Juanjo Artero) is the leader of the gang. Proud, haughty and independent, he often clashes with his father, a defender of a strong hand and old values. He was born in 1967.
Bea (Pilar Torres), Tito's sister, is the beautiful official of the group, whose love Javi and Pancho dispute throughout the series. She was born in 1967.
Desi (Cristina Torres), an inseparable friend of Bea and the daughter of separated parents, which at the time was a novelty: such a scandal is a common comment among the other boys' parents. She was born in 1967.
Tito (Miguel Joven), brother of Bea and is the smallest of the gang. Piranha's partner in arms. He was born in 1973.
Piraña (Miguel Ángel Valero), his name is Manuel (his parents know him as Manolito), but they call him Piraña because of his passion for eating, bordering on voracity. He is witty and cultured, and Tito's comrade-in-arms. He was born in 1972.
Quique (Gerardo Garrido), is Javi's best friend, located between the two older boys and the two younger ones, he is a somewhat blurred character. We know he even has a sister, but he wasn't part of the gang. He was born in 1968.
secondary
Edit
Agustín (Manuel Tejada) is the father of Bea and Tito, calm and always open to dialogue with his children.
Carmen (Elisa Montés) is the mother of Bea and Tito.
Javier (Manuel Gallardo) is Javi's father, an authoritarian who cares a lot about business.
Luisa (Helga Liné) is Javi's mother.
Jorge (Carlos Larrañaga) is Desi's father. He only appears in one chapter, "The Visitor".
Pilar (Concha Cuetos) is Desi's mother, who is separated from Jorge, her husband (Carlos Larrañaga). In the series Farmacia de guardia (1990-1995), also directed by Antonio Mercero, these two actors are the protagonists and they are divorced.
Cosme (Manuel Brieva) is Piranha's father.
Nati (Ofelia Angélica) is the mother of Piraña.
Enrique (Fernando Hilbeck) is Quique's father.
Mercedes (Concha Leza) is Quique's mother.
Frasco (Fernando Sánchez Polack) is the owner of the bar where Chanquete usually goes to play dominoes and drink slugs. He is also one of his best friends. In one of the chapters he comes to use force, shotgun in hand, when he believes Chanquete has been killed.
Buzo (Antonio P. Costafreda) is one of Chanquete's friends. He is characterized by his constant sadness and his weary resignation.
Epifanio (Roberto Camardiel) is the mayor of the town. He almost always smokes Havana cigars.
Don José (Emilio Rodríguez) is the town doctor.
Mari Luz (Esther Gala) is Desi's aunt, who lives with her sister Pilar and her niece. She can't stand her brother-in-law.
Floro (Lorenzo Ramírez) is a municipal police officer.
Barrilete (Ricardo Palacios) is another municipal police officer, immensely plump and good-natured.
Hospital Director (Antonio Mercero) is the Director of the hospital where Chanquete is admitted.

Production
The series was filmed in 16 months, between August 1979 and December 1980, mainly in Nerja in the Province of Málaga with additional footage filmed in Motril and Almuñécar in the Province of Granada. The location of Chanquete's La Dorada Ship was at 36.7525°N, 3.863°W. Cala Chica Beach is located at 36.7535°N, 3.8445°W. There were 20 episodes initially planned but one of the episodes (titled "The Excursion") had to be cancelled during filming due to difficulties in its production.

List of episodes
The order is based on original air date.  In later releases, the order of episodes is 1, 2, 7, 9, 3, 5, 4, 6, 17, 13, 11, 8, 10, 12, 14, 15, 16, 18, 19.

See also
 Nerja

References

External links
 Veranoazul.org, Page dedicated to the location of filming of the series 'Verano Azul'
 
 Web del Gonzalo Fernandez Benavides, personaje de Bruno

Spanish children's television series
Television shows set in Andalusia
1980s teen drama television series
1981 Spanish television series debuts
1982 Spanish television series endings
1980s Spanish drama television series
La 1 (Spanish TV channel) network series
Spanish teen drama television series
Television series about children
Television series about teenagers